Bossiaea laxa is a species of flowering plant in the family Fabaceae and is endemic to a small area near Norseman in Western Australia. It is a spreading, openly-branched shrub with linear to narrow oblong leaves, and bright yellow and red flowers.

Description
Flowering has been observed in May.

Taxonomy and naming
Bossiaea laxa was first formally described in 2006 by James Henderson Ross in the journal Muelleria from specimens collected in the Cave Hill Reserve north-west of Norseman in 2003. The specific epithet (laxa) means "loose" or "open" referring to the species' growth form.

Distribution and habitat
This bossiaea is only known from the Cave Hill Reserve in the Coolgardie biogeographic region where it grows in woodland.

Conservation status
Bossiaea laxa is classified as "Priority Two" by the Western Australian Government Department of Parks and Wildlife, meaning that it is poorly known and from only one or a few locations.

References

laxa
Mirbelioids
Flora of Western Australia
Plants described in 2006